Barsuan railway station is a railway station on the South Eastern Railway network in the state of Odisha, India. It serves Barsuan village. Its code is BXF. It has one platform. One Passenger train starts from Barsuan railway station.

References

See also
 Sundergarh district

Railway stations in Sundergarh district
Chakradharpur railway division